Take That & Party is the debut studio album by English boy band Take That. Released on 17 August 1992 on RCA Records, it reached number two on the UK Albums Chart and stayed in the UK Top 75 album chart for 73 weeks (almost 18 months). It was their only album not to reach number one until Wonderland also peaked at number two in 2017.

The album has been certified two times platinum in the United Kingdom.

Background, production and release

In 1989, Manchester-based music mogul Nigel Martin-Smith sought to create a British male vocal group in the vein of New Kids On The Block and The Jackson 5, his vision being a teen-oriented group with multi-demographic appeal. Martin-Smith was introduced to young singer-songwriter Gary Barlow, and was so impressed with his catalogue of material he decided to build his new-look boy band around Barlow's musical abilities. A campaign to audition young males with abilities in dancing and singing ensued, taking place in Manchester and other surrounding cities, in 1990. At 22, Howard Donald was one of the oldest to audition, and was chosen after he got time off work as a vehicle painter to continue the process.

Martin-Smith soon managed to land them a slot on television series The Hit Man and Her in 1990. The group chose to perform two of Barlow's tracks, "Love" and "My Kind of Girl," neither of which has ever been commercially released. Shortly thereafter, Martin-Smith got the group a studio session with music producer Ray Hedges for which Barlow wrote "Do What U Like," "Take That and Party," and "Waiting Around," the first three tracks written specifically to be recorded by the group. "Do What U Like" was released as the lead single on Martin-Smith's own label Dance UK on 15 July 1991, with "Waiting Around" appearing as the B-side, and "Take That & Party" being sidelined for release on their debut album.

The single, despite peaking at #82, was enough for Take That to be noticed by RCA Records, who signed them to their label and put them in contact with one of their most prolific songwriters, Graham Stack. Stack and Barlow then co-wrote the group's debut single on RCA, "Promises," which was released 18 November 1991, with "Do What U Like" appearing as the B-side. Shortly after the single peaked at #38 the band began recording again, this time with producers Billy Griffin and Ian Levine, with "Once You've Tasted Love" being the first single released from those sessions. A remix and reprise of the track "Guess Who Tasted Love" appeared as the B-side. Although it peaked at #47, Take That was given one last chance by the record label. Levine and Griffin persuaded the group's handlers to release a cover of the 1975 Tavares hit "It Only Takes a Minute;" despite the group's apprehensions, it peaked at #7 on the UK Singles Chart. For the release, they recorded "I Can Make It" and "Never Want to Let You Go," two original tracks penned by Barlow, both of which later made the album release in slightly remixed form.

Riding the crest of this wave, "I Found Heaven," written by Griffin and Levine, was released as their next single.  Group member Robbie Williams performed the lead vocal, a first for him. It was not as successful as its predecessor, however, peaking at #15. During the recording of this song, the group experienced a falling-out with Levine, and requested that they not record or write with him in the future. The single's B-side, "I'm Out," was written about this situation. RCA subsequently enlisted the services of executive producer Duncan Bridgeman, who decided to change the direction of the band's music style, and chose to record "A Million Love Songs," penned by Barlow when he was just fifteen years old. The single was a success, also peaking at #7 on the UK Singles Chart. After positive reception by critics, Bridgeman then decided to release as a single the group's cover of the Barry Manilow classic "Could It Be Magic," recorded shortly after their version of "It Only Takes a Minute." "Could It Be Magic" was the first song recorded featuring Williams on lead vocal. It peaked at #3 on the UK Singles Chart.

During Bridgeman's time with the group they also recorded "Why Can't I Wake Up With You," a saxophone-assisted ballad, which was later reworked into an electronically advanced number and released as the lead single from their second album Everything Changes. The album's track list included "Satisfied" and "Give Good Feeling," two tracks recorded during the time with Levine and Griffin, which had remained unreleased until that point. The album was released on 17 May 1992 in various formats, including a limited-edition vinyl pressing and cassette, containing twelve tracks. "Could It Be Magic" was first released on the compact disc version of the album, made available on 17 August 1992, so vinyl and cassette copies do not contain the tracks. The album was re-issued in July 2006 to celebrate the group's 15th anniversary, complete with three bonus tracks, including the B-sides "Waiting Around" and "Guess Who Tasted Love," as well as "How Can It Be," one of three songs written to accompany the release of "A Million Love Songs".

Around the time of the original album release, a VHS videocassette titled Take That and Party was also released, containing eight music videos, two compilation videos, a live a cappella performance, plus footage and interviews with the group.

It is notable that the album does not feature Howard Donald and Mark Owen performing lead vocals on any of the tracks.

Reception

In a contemporary review, The Montreal Gazette gave the album a C rating, noting that although "This album starts with '90s dance music but sometimes takes you back to the era of disco and polyester, a time that most people would rather forget, [it] is tolerable only because the rest of the album is good."

Track listing

Notes
 signifies a remixer
 signifies an additional vocal producer
"Could It Be Magic" is inspired by "Prelude in C minor" by Chopin. The track is omitted from the LP version. Later 1992 pressings replace the original album version with the Radio Rapino mix; the album version was reinstated in the 2006 reissue.

Personnel
 Gary Barlow – vocals, songwriting
 Howard Donald – vocals
 Jason Orange – vocals
 Mark Owen – vocals
 Robbie Williams – vocals
 Duncan Bridgeman – producer
 Tobin Sellars – engineer
 Nigel Stock – arranger
 Pete Hammond – DJ
 Ian Levine – co-producer
 Billy Griffin – co-producer

Charts

Weekly charts

Year-end charts

Certifications

References

Take That albums
1992 debut albums